Expedition 44 was the 44th expedition to the International Space Station. It commenced with the departure of Soyuz TMA-15M from the ISS with the Expedition 42/43 crew on 11 June 2015, and ended with the departure of Soyuz TMA-16M on 11 September 2015.

Yury Lonchakov was originally supposed to be the commander of Expedition 44 following being Flight Engineer 3 on Expedition 43. However, he resigned from the Russian Federal Space Agency on September 6, 2013.

Crew

Source Spacefacts

Achievements
In July 2015, Kelly and Lindgren became the first Americans ever to eat food grown entirely in space

See also

ISS year long mission

References

External links

 NASA's Space Station Expeditions page
 NASA, Space Station Partners Announce Future Crew Members

Expeditions to the International Space Station
2015 in spaceflight